Randy Rowe (born June 10, 1980) is a Canadian former professional ice hockey forward who played most notably in the ECHL, and became just the seventh player in league history to play over 600 games. He last played for the Toledo Walleye of the ECHL.

Career
During his time with the Belleville Bulls, Rowe also attended two NHL training camps. Rowe attended his first rookie camp as a free agent in 1997 with the St. Louis Blues. The following season, Rowe attended the Vancouver Canucks' training camp and shared locker stalls with Canucks' captain Mark Messier.

After turning professional in 2001 with the Peoria Rivermen of the ECHL, Rowe split his career between the ECHL and the AHL. Rowe is one of the most decorated players in the history of the ECHL, he returned to the Walleye after spending the previous season in 2011–12 as captain of the Trenton Titans.

Retirement
On August 13, 2013, he announced his retirement from professional hockey after 12 seasons, finishing 14th all-time in ECHL goal scoring. Since his retirement, Rowe had joined the OJHL's Wellington Dukes as an assistant coach.

Career statistics

Awards and honors
1998-99, Won the J. Ross Robertson Cup as a member of the Belleville Bulls
2000-01, Most goals scored (64), OHL
2000-01, Named to the CHL Third All-Star Team
2000-01, Awarded the Leo Lalonde Memorial Trophy for best overage player in the OHL
2003-04, Played in ECHL All-Star Game, named MVP
2007-08, Named ECHL Player Of The Week (March 24–30, 2008)
2007-08, Named ECHL Player Of The Month (April 2008)
2007-08, Named ECHL Plus Performer of the Month (April 2008)
2007-08, Led Johnstown Chiefs in points scored (68) and plus/minus (+21)
2000-10, Named to the ECHL All-Decade Team
2012-13, Awarded the ECHL Sportsmanship Award

References

External links

1980 births
Belleville Bulls players
Canadian ice hockey forwards
Charlotte Checkers (1993–2010) players
Johnstown Chiefs players
Lake Erie Monsters players
Living people
Ice hockey people from Ontario
Peoria Rivermen (ECHL) players
Sportspeople from the County of Brant
Springfield Falcons players
St. John's Maple Leafs players
Trenton Titans players
Toledo Walleye players
Canadian expatriate ice hockey players in the United States